Cassidulidae is a family of echinoderms belonging to the order Cassiduloida.

Genera:
 Anisopetalus
 Cassidulus Lamarck, 1801
 Echinobrinus Ébray, 1862
 Eurhodia Haime, 1853
 Galerolampas (Cotteau, 1889)
 Glossaster Lambert, 1918
 Paralampas Duncan & Sladen, 1882
 Rhyncholampas Agassiz, 1869

References

 
Cassiduloida
Echinoderm families